Salmaniyeh may refer to:
 Salmaniyeh, Jiroft, Kerman Province
 Salmaniyeh, Qaleh Ganj, Kerman Province
 Salmaniyeh, Khuzestan
 Salmaniyeh, Razavi Khorasan